The Nautla River is a river of Mexico. The river starts on the northern slope of Cofre de Perote volcano under the names Altotonga or Alseseca and flows northeastwards to empty into the Gulf of Mexico. The Bobos River and Quila River are tributaries. It has the 23rd most runoff of the rivers of Mexico.

See also
List of rivers of Mexico

References

Atlas of Mexico, 1975 (http://www.lib.utexas.edu/maps/atlas_mexico/river_basins.jpg).
Estuario Casitas - Nautla
The Prentice Hall American World Atlas, 1984.
Rand McNally, The New International Atlas, 1993.

Rivers of Mexico
Drainage basins of the Gulf of Mexico
Rivers of Veracruz